DeWereldMorgen is a free Belgian alternative media website, started in March 2010 as a synergy between Pala.be  and the Belgian section of Independent Media Center. It is operated by a core of professional journalists and which receives contributions from ±300 volunteers per year. The editorial core is given a monthly salary.

All its content is submitted under a Creative Commons license, namely CC BY-NC-ND 2.0 BE.

Alternative 

Kaat Van Damme's master thesis claims that DeWereldMorgen can be defined as an "alternative media" website with regards to content, editing, and business model. In the Belgian context, DeWereldMorgen has been coined together with Apache and Mondiaal Nieuws as alternative news media. It is characterized by politicization.

Content 

The website aims to be independent of big media organizations and features the voices of non-governmental organizations and social movements. It can be characterized as preferring to be correct, rather than neutral.

In relation to climate change, Yves Pepermans characterized DeWereldMorgen as coming "closest to a democratic arena" (compared with other Belgian newspapers De Standaard and De Morgen); and has claimed it criticizes the role of markets and stakeholders in relation to climate change, and that it advocates for larger public control over the economy for a socially just outcome for climate change. However, its addition to the debate is one-sided, and the media outlet has few readers.

Editing 

Other than traditional media, there is less contrast between the professional journalist and the reader. Reactions can be posted even anonymously, and can only rarely be removed. Further more, DeWereldMorgen encourages readers to contribute to the website via a section of the website called "Community". Even though everybody can create new articles in the "Community", DeWereldMorgen is critical of the model of gatewatching: instead, a professional redaction selects articles for promotion to the front page. DeWereldMorgen also tries to inform its readers about changes within the website.

Business model 

Because DeWereldMorgen presents oneself as a "movement for media and democracy", they receive subsidies; without which they would have serious financial troubles. Other than these subsidies, it is mostly dependent on financial partners, which can create a bias towards no negative articles about those partners. Micropayments, book sales, donations and lectures generate a smaller part of its revenue. In 2010,  was donated to DeWereldMorgen, possibly by people who cancel their paid subscription to another newspaper. DeWereldMorgen is sponsored by trade unions.

60% of the total revenue for 2010 was received via subsidies, some of which stem from the European Union and from different departments of the Flemish Community, such as the Department of popular education. While DeWereldMorgen thinks it receives much too little subsidies in comparison to other media, an extreme-right nationalist website called "REACT" (where Vlaams Belang, Voorpost and :nl:Vlaamse Solidaire Vakbond advertise) criticizes the website and its subsidies in denigrating language.

Scholarly interest 

A master thesis has analysed the platform in relation to Apache (another Belgian alternative media website) in 2010, and a post-doctoral linguist analyses it with regards to the Belgian newspaper De Morgen. It has been contrasted with newspapers De Standaard and De Morgen in a 2015 PhD thesis; in relation to politicization of climate change, and it has been subjected to a case-study of "positionality" and "the environmental justice frame".

References

European news websites